Anja Kampmann (born 1983) is a German poet and author.

Biography
Kampmann was born in 1983 in Hamburg. She studied at the University of Hamburg and at the German Institute for Literature in Leipzig. She also attended the renowned International Writing Program at the University of Iowa with a scholarship, then start of a dissertation on Samuel Beckett's later prose (musicality & silence) as well as work for the radio. Since 2011, she has been working for Deutschlandfunk and NZZ, among others.

Her poetry has been published in numerous German publications. Her debut collection Proben von Stein und Licht appeared in 2016 in Edition Lyrik. It was shortlisted for the National Book Award for Translated Literature in 2020. In 2021 she published her second collection of poetry Der Hund ist immer hungrig (the dog is always hungry) which was widely acclaimed.

She lives in Leipzig.

Works
 2016: 
 2018: 
 2019:  English translation by Anne Posten
 2021:

Awards
 2010: Scholarship “International Writing Program” University of Iowa
 2013: 1st Prize MDR Literature Prize
 2014: Feldkircher Poetry Prize (2nd prize)
 2015: Wolfgang Weyrauch Prize
 2017: Finalist Alfred Döblin Prize
 2018: Nomination for the Leipzig Book Fair Prize ( Fiction ) with High as the waters rise
 2018: Nomination for the German Book Prize (longlist) with High as the waters rise
 2018: Finalist in the Aspekte-Literaturpreis with High As The Waters Rise
 2018: Literature Prize of the Lüneburg District for High As The Waters Rise
 2018:  for High as the waters rise
 2019: Lessing Prize of the Free State of Saxony (sponsorship prize)
 2019/2020: Stadtschreiber von Bergen
 2020: High as the Waters Rise. Translation of Anne Posten. Shortlisted for the National Book Award.
 2020: Rainer Malkowski Prize of the Bavarian Academy of Fine Arts (together with Norbert Hummelt)

References

External links
 

1983 births
Living people
Writers from Hamburg
German women poets
German women novelists
21st-century German novelists
21st-century German poets
German-language poets